Alexander Gilli (29 April 1904 - 16 May 2007) was an Austrian botanist and pteridologist. He was a pioneer in research on plant communities.

Some publications 
 1968. Afghanische Pflanzengesellschaften. Vegetatio 16 (5/6): 307—375 doi 10.1007/BF00257022
 1979. Beiträge zur Flora von Papua-New Guinea, II. Dicotyledones. Ann. des Naturhistorischen Museums in Wien 83: 417—474

Honors
Corresponding member of the "Naturhistorisches Museum"

Eponyms 
Several species are named after Gilli, including:
 (Alliaceae) Allium gillii Wendelbo
 (Plumbaginaceae) Acantholimon gillii Rech.f. & Koeie

References 

20th-century Austrian botanists
1904 births
2007 deaths